Synersaga bleszynskii is a moth in the family Lecithoceridae. It is found in Taiwan and Zhejiang, China.

The wingspan is 30 mm, making it one of the largest species in Lecithoceridae.

References

Moths described in 1978
bleszynskii